María Angelina Acuña Sagastume de Castañeda (31 January 1905 – 14 June 2006) was a Guatemalan writer of prose and poetry. A major poetry figure in her country, she was especially known for her rigor in managing classical verse within the sonnet. The writer Margarita Carrera called Acuña the "sister in spirit of Gabriela Mistral".

Biography
María Angelina Acuña Sagastume de Castañeda was born in Jutiapa to Francisco Acuña and Adela Sagastume de Acuña.

She moved to Guatemala City where she studied to become a teacher of Primary Education. She earned a Bachelor of Science and Letters at Instituto Normal Central para Señoritas Belén. After graduating, she worked in teaching institutes such as Instituto Normal Central para Señoritas Belén and the Instituto Nacional Centroamérica (INCA). She taught as a visiting professor at Florida Southern College (Lakeland, Florida). Acuña began publishing poetry in the 1930s and was one of the most prolific women poets in Guatemala, publishing in the newspaper El Imparcial, the leading woman's magazine Nosotras, as well as in bound collections.

She participated in many poetry contests, winning numerous awards, as a means to open the door to publishing and her skillful use of language helped her succeed and gain recognition a society which still mostly believed that men's intelligence was superior to women's.

Unlike some of her fellow Guatemalan female writers, like Elisa Hall de Asturias who gave up writing due to the then-prevalent misogyny, or Magdalena Spínola who faced ostracism during the dictatorship of Jorge Ubico Castañeda, Acuña was able to manipulate language and use poetic forms to address the culture without appearing to be a threat. Rather than promoting the heroic fatherland united under "Father God", Acuña celebrated her nationalism by employing imagery of mother earth's fertility to evoke both pride in her homeland and address the patriarchy of her times without explicit confrontation.

In 1938, she participated in an anthology called Colección lila with Olga Violeta Luna de Marroquín, María del Pilar de Garcia, and Magdalena Spínola, which was Central America's first women's poetry collection, both written and published by women. She founded and directed for several literary journals throughout her career and was a member of the Academia Guatemalteca de la Lengua.

Death
Acuña died at the age of 101 in her home in her native Jutiapa, Guatemala.

Awards
1960 Woman of the Americas by the Pan American Union of Women in New York
1960 Order of Quetzal
1974 Order of Francisco Marroquín
 Distinction of Emeritus of Merit by the Faculty of Humanities at the University of San Carlos of Guatemala 
2005 Quetzal of the Jade Maya, the highest honor of the Quetzal and first ever given to a woman

Selected works
 La gavilla de Ruth (1938)
 Ofrenda Lirica a Guatemala (1939)
 Para que duerma un indito (1952)
 Fiesta de Luciérnagas (1953)
 Madre Américas (1960)
 El llamado de la cumbre (1960)
 Canto de amor en latitud marina (1968)
 Elogio del soneto (1999)

References

External links 
 
 

1900s births
2006 deaths
People from Jutiapa Department
20th-century Guatemalan poets
Guatemalan women poets
Guatemalan centenarians
20th-century Guatemalan women writers
Women centenarians